was a Japanese domain in the Edo period.  It is associated with Hizen Province in modern-day Saga Prefecture on the island of Kyūshū.

In the han system, Ogi was a political and economic abstraction based on periodic cadastral surveys and projected agricultural yields.  In other words, the domain was defined in terms of kokudaka, not land area. This was different from the feudalism of the West.

History
Ogi Domain was originally a sub-domain of the Saga Domain, founded in 1642 for Nabeshima Motoshige, the eldest son of the first daimyō of Saga Domain, Nabeshima Katsushige. Although Motoshige was the eldest son, he was displaced in the line of succession for Saga Domain by his younger half-brother, Nabeshima Tadanao, whose mother was a daughter of shōgun Tokugawa Ieyasu.

Motoshige was assigned holdings of 73,000 koku, and also served as an advisor to shōgun Tokugawa Iemitsu His son Nabeshima Naoyoshi became second daimyō of Ogi and built a fortified house ( jin'ya ) to be the domain headquarters in what is now the city of Ogi. His son, Nabeshima Mototake rose to high positions within the Tokugawa shogunate under shōgun Tokugawa Tsunayoshi; however, from his time onwards, the domain's financial situation was very severe and on the verge of bankruptcy, causing relations with the main line at Saga Domain to become increasingly strained.

During the time of Nabeshima Naotaka, Ogi Domain was finally recognized as an independent domain directly reporting to the Shōgunate, and permission was granted to erect a castle; however, the domain lacked the finances to do so.

The Boshin War of the Meiji Restoration, Nabeshima Naotora, the 11th and final daimyō, supported the Satchō Alliance was called upon to lead Ogi's forces against the Tokugawa remnants at Akita in northern Japan. For his loyalty to Emperor Meiji and efforts in the war, the revenues of Ogi Domain were raised by an additional 5,000 koku in August 1869. However, this reward was only nominal, as with the abolition of the han system less than two years later in 1871 Ogi Domain became part of the new Saga Prefecture.

Nabeshima Naotora and his heirs were granted the title of viscount (shishaku) under the kazoku peerage.

List of daimyōs 
The hereditary daimyōs were head of the clan and head of the domain.

 Nabeshima clan, 1635–1868 (tozama; 52,000 koku)

{| class=wikitable
!  ||Name || Tenure || Courtesy title || Court Rank || Revenue
|-
||1||||1642–1654||Kii-no-kami || Lower 5th (従五位下) ||73,000 koku
|-
||2||||1654–1679|| Kaga-no-kami || Lower 5th (従五位下) ||73,000 koku
|-
||3||||1679–1713||Kii-no-kami || Lower 5th (従五位下) ||73,000 koku
|-
||4||||1713–1714||Kaga-no-kami || Lower 5th (従五位下) ||73,000 koku
|-
||5||||1714–1744||Kaga-no-kami || Lower 5th (従五位下) ||73,000 koku
|-
||6||||1744–1764||Kii-no-kami || Lower 5th (従五位下) ||73,000 koku
|-
||7||||1764–1794||Kaga-no-kami || Lower 5th (従五位下) ||73,000 koku
|-
||8||||1794–1804||Kii-no-kami || Lower 5th (従五位下) ||73,000 koku
|-
||9||||1804–1850||Kii-no-kami || Lower 5th (従五位下) ||73,000 koku
|-
||10||||1850–1864||Kaga-no-kami || Lower 5th (従五位下) ||73,000 koku
|-
||11||||1864–1871|| Kii-no-kami || Lower 5th (従五位下)  ||73,000 koku
|-
|}

Geography
The lands of Ogi Domain were in Ogi District and portions of Saga District and Matsuura District in Saga Prefecture.

See also 
 List of Han
 Abolition of the han system

References

External links
 "Kashima" at Edo 300 

Domains of Japan